Duved is a village (locality) situated in Åre Municipality, Jämtland County, Sweden with 663 inhabitants in 2010.

It is a resort village and has a station on the Mittbanan Line.

Gallery

References 

Populated places in Åre Municipality
Jämtland